Luis Osvaldo Hurtado Larrea (born 26 June 1939) is an Ecuadorian author and politician who served as President of Ecuador from 24 May 1981 to 10 August 1984.

Hurtado was born in Chambo, Chimborazo Province. During his studies at the Catholic University in the 1960s, Hurtado became a student leader. Afterwards, he lectured political sociology at his alma mater and at the Centro Andino of the University of New Mexico. He became one of the most widely read political scientists of his home country. In 1977, he authored an influential book on Ecuadorian politics titled El Poder Político en el Ecuador (English: "Political Power in Ecuador").

Hurtado drew progressive Catholics and younger professionals away from the Social Christian Party and into the Christian Democrats movement which was inspired by Christian communitarianism and Liberation theology and criticized capitalist exploitation. At the time, it was the most radical among Ecuador's non-Marxist parties and Hurtado was suspected by his right-wing opponents of being a "closet Marxist". In 1978, he merged his Christian Democrats with the progressive wing of the Conservative Party to form the Popular Democracy party.

In 1979, Hurtado was chosen as running mate of presidential candidate Jaime Roldós Aguilera of the populist Concentration of People's Forces. Roldós was successful and Hurtado became Vice President of Ecuador. On Sunday, 24 May 1981, Jaime Roldós Aguilera died in a plane crash. Hurtado succeeded Roldós Aguilera as President of Ecuador and served out the rest of his term.

Hurtado is a member of the Club de Madrid. He is also a member of the Inter-American Dialogue.

Selected works

References

External links
 Short Curriculum at EcuadorOnline

1939 births
Living people
People from Chambo
Pontifical Catholic University of Ecuador alumni
Academic staff of the Pontifical Catholic University of Ecuador
University of New Mexico faculty
Vice presidents of Ecuador
Presidents of Ecuador
Christian Democratic Union (Ecuador) politicians
Members of the Inter-American Dialogue